Angela Lisa Winbush (born January 18, 1955) is an American R&B/soul singer-songwriter, musician and record producer who rose to fame first in the 1980s R&B duo René & Angela, also scoring hits as a solo artist. To date, Winbush has sold over 10 million albums and singles worldwide.

Biography

Early life and career
Born in St. Louis, Missouri, Angela began singing in church. She grew up in a middle-class area of St. Louis.  Angela is a graduate of Northwest High School.  She did not initially aspire to a career in music, instead studying architecture at Howard University, singing only to earn extra money. She continued to sing in church while at Howard as well as with gospel legend Richard Smallwood.  She also performed as a singer with a group called "Hot Tea" while she attended Howard University.  They opened for various well-known performers during shows and also did background singing for recording artists.   One of the other members of "Hot Tea" was Tawatha Agee, who later did a lot of background singing on the albums of several well-noted recording artists, eventually joining the funk/soul band Mtume.

By 1977, Angela had changed her major to music education and recorded a demo. She shopped it to various record labels with no success but, through a personal introduction furnished by respected industry veteran, Wayne K. Garfield, the demo was heard by New York disc jockey Gary Byrd, who made the call that landed Angela a spot in Stevie Wonder's backing vocal group, Wonderlove. Becoming Wonder's protégé, she learned a great deal about writing and arranging songs.

While in Los Angeles with Wonder, Angela met singer Rene Moore. The two formed the duo René & Angela later that year.  They soon came to the realization that they could be successful as duo music writers and producers for others as well, and began pursuing that goal. René & Angela released their self-titled debut album in 1980, followed by Wall to Wall in 1982 and Rise in 1983. During this period they scored two top 20 R&B hit singles, "I Love You More" and "My First Love.”

A Street Called Desire and meeting Ron Isley
During Rene & Angela's early years, Moore and Winbush were asked to write and produce four songs for Janet Jackson's 1982 self-titled debut album, Janet Jackson. One of the songs, "Young Love," became Jackson's first top ten US R&B hit reaching number six on the chart. They also had songs recorded by the likes of Rufus & Chaka Khan, Lamont Dozier and Odyssey.

In 1985 they scored a US number one hit with "I Have Learned to Respect the Power of Love" by Stephanie Mills, with whom Angela had forged a close friendship (an earlier version of the song had been recorded by Alton McClain & Destiny). Having signed with Mercury Records, the duo released their breakthrough album, Street Called Desire the same year. Among the hit singles included on the album was their first R&B number one with the dance single, "Save Your Love (For #1)," which included guest vocals from rapper Kurtis Blow, making it besides Chaka Khan's "I Feel For You," one of the first songs to prominently feature a rapper. Other hit singles included "I'll Be Good", the mostly Winbush-led "Your Smile" – another number one hit – and the subsequent "You Don't Have to Cry" which hit number two in the beginning of 1986. Eventually Street Called Desire sold over a million copies, going platinum, but on the brink of their greatest success, tensions between Winbush and Moore had grown. After their split, Moore would continue to find success as a songwriter and producer, most notably for Michael Jackson.

In 1986, Winbush was introduced to Ronald Isley, lead singer of the influential Isley Brothers after Benny Medina had agreed to ask Winbush to be involved with the Isleys' next record when Isley proposed plans to work with Winbush on a future project. Producing, writing and arranging the Isleys' Smooth Sailin' album, Winbush helped the group, now featuring just Ronald and Rudolph (eldest brother O'Kelly had died the previous year), score a top 10 R&B hit with the title track.

Sharp and subsequent follow-ups
In turn, Isley opted to manage Winbush and he helped in the process of releasing her debut solo album, Sharp, which was also released in 1987. The album included the hit, "Angel" which showcased Winbush's four-octave range. The song reached the No. 1 R&B position for two weeks in 1987. Other notable hits include the dance track, "Run to Me," "C'est Toi (It's You)" and the Ron Isley duet, "Hello Beloved." The album spent 28 weeks on the Billboard 200 album chart and 51 weeks on the Hot R&B/Hip-Hop Albums chart.

In 1988, she wrote and produced two tracks for Sheena Easton's gold album The Lover in Me – "Without You" and "Fire and Rain," both of which showcased Easton's lower range and soulful vocals. In 1989, Winbush released her second solo album The Real Thing. The title track "It's The Real Thing" reached number two on the R&B chart while subsequent hits "No More Tears" and "Lay Your Troubles Down" continued Winbush's top 40 success on the R&B charts where she was now a fixture on despite failed attempts to cross her over to pop audiences. The album also included her version of "I Have Learned To Respect The Power of Love"). The same year, Winbush wrote and produced another US R&B number one for Stephanie Mills with "Something in the Way (You Make Me Feel)" for Mill's album Home, as well as the album cut "So Good, So Right" (previously recorded by D'atra Hicks).

In 1989, Winbush oversaw all songwriting and production on The Isley Brothers' 25th album Spend the Night including the US R&B number three hit "Spend the Night (Ce Soir)". The following year, she scored more top 20 R&B hits as a writer/producer for R&B girl group Body ("Footsteps In The Dark") and newcomer Lalah Hathaway ("Baby Don't Cry") as well as contributing cuts to their respective albums. In 1992, Winbush co-wrote and co-produced with longtime manager/collaborator/lover Ronald Isley another album for The Isley Brothers, Tracks of Life, featuring the R&B hit "Sensitive Lover".

On June 26, 1993, Winbush and Isley, 13 years Angela's senior, married. A year later Winbush released her third self-titled solo album, which included the R&B hit, "Treat U Rite." Produced by Chuckii Booker, the song peaked at number six on the R&B chart making it Winbush's ninth top ten R&B hit altogether in her career. In 1996, Winbush produced the bulk of The Isley Brothers' Mission to Please album, which included the hit "Floatin' On Your Love," a duet between Angela and Ron Isley. The song was later remixed by Sean "Puffy" Combs and featured guest vocals from Lil' Kim and the group 112 in backgrounds. The video for it showcased Winbush serenading Isley's Mr. Biggs character. Winbush continued to collaborate with the Isley Brothers until 2001's Eternal with Angela notably only contributing one track ("Warm Summer Night") as their marriage began to cool off. In 2002, Winbush and Isley quietly divorced. In 2003, Winbush made news when it was found out she was diagnosed with ovarian cancer. Eventually after a successful surgery, the cancer was in remission and Winbush returned to perform on the road.

Legacy and influence
Since starting out with Rene & Angela, Winbush and Moore have played an influence on various R&B and hip-hop acts. In the latter genre, their music has been sampled by acts such as The Notorious B.I.G. (who featured her and Jay-Z on his Rene & Angela-sampled "I Love You More" for the song "I Love the Dough"), Foxy Brown (who sampled her "I'll Be Good" for her 1997 top ten hit, "I'll Be," Rapper Sylk-E. Fyne's 1998 hit "Romeo and Juliet" that samples Rene and Angela's "You Don't Have to Cry," and last but not least singer Avant re-recorded the Rene & Angela ballad, "My First Love," with singer Keke Wyatt in 2000. In appreciation during Avant's performance of the song on BET's 106 & Park, in 2001, Winbush surprised the audience by singing alongside Avant on the song. As a singer, Winbush is well noted by her gospel-influenced musical humming during her songs. She has influenced the likes of Syleena Johnson and Chante Moore. Winbush and former partner Rene Moore also shared the distinction for being one of the first R&B acts to prominently feature a rap act in a R&B song sharing that distinction with Jody Watley, Chaka Khan and funk band Cameo. Winbush also carries the distinction of being one of the few female artists to find success as a songwriter, arranger, producer and session musician (Winbush also is an avid musician playing piano and keyboards).

Personal life
During a 2006 interview on the Christian TV show, Gospel of Music with Jeff Majors, Winbush disclosed that she had overcome Stage 3 ovarian cancer after six months of chemotherapy in 2003.  During the interview she revealed that her undying faith in God got her through having a cyst (benign) removed from her breast, the ending of her marriage to Isley in divorce, and her struggle with depression.

TV appearances
After years of absence from mainstream TV, in March 2010, Winbush performed "Angel", live on the late night talk show The Mo'Nique Show. She was also featured on the TV One documentary Unsung, which first aired in October 2010. It was revealed that Rene Moore became violent with Winbush, in latter years, which led Winbush to cease her musical journey with Moore because she was no longer interested in being a member of "Rene & Angela." Moore declined to be interviewed for "Unsung."

Discography

Studio albums

Compilation albums
Ultimate Collection (2001, Hip-O)
Greatest Love Songs (2003, Hip-O)

Singles

Other Appearances
With Donald Byrd
Thank You...For F.U.M.L. (Funking Up My Life) (Elektra, 1978)

Awards and nominations

References

External links
 Official website
 Biography & booking information
 

1955 births
Living people
African-American women singer-songwriters
African-American Christians
American women pop singers
American soul singers
American keyboardists
African-American record producers
Musicians from St. Louis
Mercury Records artists
Elektra Records artists
Island Records artists
Record producers from Missouri
Singer-songwriters from Missouri
20th-century American women singers
21st-century American women singers
Ballad musicians
American women record producers
20th-century American singers
21st-century American singers
20th-century African-American women
21st-century African-American women singers